Michael Chikelu Mbabuike (August 1943 – December 2006) was a Nigerian poet, professor, and linguist.  He held the chair of African Studies in the Humanities Department at Hostos Community College of the City University of New York, and was president of the Faculty Senate there.

An Igbo, Mbabuike obtained his bachelor's degree with honors from the University of Nigeria, Nsukka campus. He received his master's degree and doctorate in literature at the Sorbonne, Paris, France.  He came to the United States in the late 1970s. In addition to being a professor he was director of the Center for Igbo Studies at Hostos Community College. He was twice president of the New York African Studies Association (NYASA).

Selected works
 1988 "A survey of cultural and normative changes within the Ibo family structure in the last two decades"
 1995 "Architecture of a National Literature in Africa: Problematics of Identity and Structure"
 1997 Nigeria thirty years after the civil war
 1998 Poems of Memory Trips

Notes

Further reading
Uwazurike, P. Chudi (2007) "On Mbabuike's Nigerian American Intellectual Journeys: A Personal Tribute" Dialectical Anthropology 31: pp. 111–125

External links
 Brief biography of Michael C. Mbabuike from KWENU, accessed 30 December 2008
 Obaze, Oseloka (2007) "The sun has set at noon: An elegy for Prof. Michael Chikelu Mbabuike" KNENU, 7 January 2007, accessed 30 December 2008

Nigerian Africanists
Igbo poets
Igbo linguists
Nigerian emigrants to the United States
Linguists from Nigeria
University of Paris alumni
City University of New York faculty
1943 births
2006 deaths
Igbo writers
University of Nigeria alumni
20th-century poets
Hostos Community College faculty
20th-century linguists